Rajapur Road railway station is a station on Konkan Railway. It is at a distance of  down from origin. The preceding station on the line is Saundal railway station and the next station is Vaibhavwadi Road railway station.

The railway station has only one track and platform. Only five trains per day halt at station, three Express trains and two Passengers trains.

The station is built in a dug section of hill, so one has to climb down from the station to the platform.

 Konkan Kanya Express   Mumbai C.S.T.–Madgaon-Mumbai C.S.T
 Mandovi Express     Mumbai C.S.T–Madgaon-Mumbai C.S.T
 Tutari Express   Dadar Central–Sawantwadi Road–Dadar Central
 Sindhudurg Passenger Diva Jn–Sawantwadi–Diva Jn
 Ratnagiri–Madgaon Passenger

References

Ratnagiri railway division
Railway stations in Ratnagiri district